Laetitia Marie Madeleine Susanne Valentine de Belzunce d'Arenberg (born September 2, 1941), known as Laetitia d'Arenberg, is a French Uruguayan businesswoman.

Personal life
She was born on September 2, 1941, in Brummana, Mandate for Syria and the Lebanon (now Lebanon). She is a daughter of Henri de Belzunce, Marquis de Belzunce, and Marie-Thérèse de la Poëze d'Harambure (1911–2005), members of the historical French nobility by birth. Her father was an officer in the Moroccan Tirailleurs and died fighting for France at the Battle of Monte Cassino on May 13, 1944. He belonged to a family of ancient nobility in France, originally from Lower Navarre, who held the seigneurie of Belzunce near Bayonne (where the family was notable since the 12th century) and had received the Honneurs de la Cour at Paris in 1739.

On August 20, 1949, her mother was remarried to Prince Erik Engelbert, 11th Duke of Arenberg (1901–1992). In 1951, she moved with her family to Uruguay because her family feared the expansion of the Korean War to Europe. On February 15, 1956, Laetitia and her brother (Rodrigue) were adopted by their stepfather, the Duke of Arenberg. Her legal surname became "de Belzunce d'Arenberg", and she became one of the heirs to his personal fortune.

On June 19, 1965, she was married civilly to HIRH Archduke Leopold Franz of Austria-Tuscany at St. Gilgen, Austria. The religious nuptials followed on July 28 at Menetou-Salon, France.

They have two children:
Archduke Sigismund Otto of Austria, Prince of Tuscany (born April 21, 1966, in Lausanne), married on September 11, 1999, in Kensington, Elyssa Juliet Edmonstone (born September 11, 1973, in Glasgow), daughter of Sir Archibald Bruce Charles Edmonstone, 7th Baronet, and Juliet Elizabeth Deakin (daughter of Major-General Peter Deakin). They have three children. They divorced on June 25, 2013, with annulment in 2016. He is now head of the Tuscan Grand Ducal branch of the House of Habsburg-Lorraine.
Archduke Guntram Maria of Austria, Prince of Tuscany (born July 21, 1967, in Punta del Este), married on April 13, 1996, in Cuernavaca, Debora de Sola (born January 21, 1970, in San Salvador), daughter of Orlando de Sola and Marion Liebes. They have two children.

Laetitia and her husband divorced on May 21, 1981, at Salzburg, Austria. Archduke Leopold Franz moved to Europe and remarried a commoner in June 1993 (and was again divorced in 1998). He renounced his headship of the House of Tuscany in favor of his and Laetitia's elder son on April 12, 1994, while Laetitia remained in Uruguay. Some years later she was remarried, to John Anson.

Honours

By decree of the President of the French Republic, Nicolas Sarkozy, on April 10, 2009, Laetitia d'Arenberg was accorded the medal of the Legion of Honor in the grade of Knight (Chevalier). This distinction was awarded in recognition of her thirty years of professional success that encompassed commitment to numerous social projects in Uruguay, particularly to benefit disadvantaged children and young people addicted to drugs. The official award ceremony occurred on September 24, sponsored by a French Senate delegation during an official visit to Uruguay, led by Senator Jean-Marc Pastor and accompanied by Senators Rémy Pointereau, François Fortassin, Gérard Miquel and Annie Jarraud-Vergnolle.

See also 
 House of Arenberg
 Famille de Belzunce

References

External links 
 
 
 Francia condecora a la Princesa Laetitia d’Arenberg
 Remise de la Légion d'Honneur à SAS Princesse Laetitia d’Arenberg (24 septembre 2009).
 Laetitia D'Aremberg, la princesa gaucha
 El País: Príncipe de Punta

Dukes of Arenberg
Uruguayan businesspeople
Uruguayan people of French descent
1941 births
Living people
Uruguayan women in business